Saint-Jean-de-Brébeuf is a municipality in the Municipalité régionale de comté des Appalaches in Quebec, Canada. It is part of the Chaudière-Appalaches region and the population is 397 as of 2009.

First named Lower Ireland due to its location in the township of Ireland and in opposition to Upper Ireland, now the hamlet of Maple Grove in Irlande, Saint-Jean-de-Brébeuf was first colonized by English, Irish and Scottish settlers. The current name was given to the municipality at its constitution in 1946. It honours Jean de Brébeuf, a French Jesuit missionary martyred in Sainte-Marie among the Hurons, near Midland, Ontario, in 1649.

The former parish church was converted in 2014 to house Le Théâtre Bleu performance venue.

Sources

Commission de toponymie du Québec
Ministère des Affaires municipales, des Régions et de l'Occupation du territoire

Municipalities in Quebec
Incorporated places in Chaudière-Appalaches
1946 establishments in Quebec